Eduard Grigoryevich Zenovka (born 26 April 1969) is a former Olympic modern pentathlete.

Career
He competed at the 1992 Olympics as part of the unified team and won a silver medal in the team event and a bronze medal in the individual event. He represented Russia at the 1996 Olympics where he won a silver medal in the individual event.

Personal life 
He is married to Russian Choreographer in Russian National team for rhythmic gymnastics, Irina Zenovka. He was previously engaged to rhythmic gymnast World Champion Oxana Kostina, who died from injuries sustained in a car crash. The police investigation revealed that Zenovka, who was driving the car, was heavily intoxicated at the time of the accident.

References

External links
 

1969 births
Living people
Soviet male modern pentathletes
Russian male modern pentathletes
Olympic modern pentathletes of the Unified Team
Olympic modern pentathletes of Russia
Modern pentathletes at the 1992 Summer Olympics
Modern pentathletes at the 1996 Summer Olympics
Olympic silver medalists for the Unified Team
Olympic bronze medalists for the Unified Team
Olympic silver medalists for Russia
Olympic medalists in modern pentathlon
Medalists at the 1996 Summer Olympics
Medalists at the 1992 Summer Olympics